The Pakistani Republican Party was formed in October 1955, by a break away faction of the Muslim League and other politicians supporting the creation of the West Pakistan province, on the instigation of key leaders in the military and civil service. The President of the party was Dr Khan Sahib, Chief Minister of West Pakistan. The main instigator behind this development was Iskander Mirza, the then Governor General of Pakistan. He was the vice president of this party and later became the inaugural President of Pakistan in 1956. The Central Parliamentary Leader was Sir Feroz Khan Noon, Prime Minister of Pakistan (1957 - 1958).

Party leaders

Punjab
Nawab Muzaffar Ali Khan Qizilbash, Fazal Ilahi Chaudhry (Gujrat District), Syed Amjad Ali (Lahore District), Sardar Abdul Hamid Khan Dasti (Muzaffargarh District), Col. Syed Abid Hussain (Jhang District), Sardar Amir Azam Khan, Syed Jamil Hussain Rizvi (Gujrat District), Makhdumzada Syed Hassan Mahmud (Rahim Yar Khan District), Mahr Muhammad Sadiq (Faisalabad District), Chaudhri Abdul Ghani Ghuman (Sialkot District), Begum Khudeja G. A. Khan (Faisalabad District), Rukan-ud-Daulah Shamsher Jang Ali-Haj Nawab Sajjad Ali Khan (Gujranwala District).

Sindh
Kazi Fazllullah Ubedullah (Larkana District), Pirzada Abdus Sattar (Sukkur District), Mirza Mumtaz Hassan Qizilbash (Khairpur Mirs), Haji Mir Ali Ahmed Khan Talpur (Hyderabad District), Haji Najmuddin Laghari sirewal (badin District) and Syed Khair Shah Imam Ali Shah (Nawabshah District).

North-West Frontier Province
Dr. Khan Sahib, Sardar Abdur Rashid Khan, Khan Jalaluddin Khan Jalal Baba, Khan Nur Muhammad Khan and Khan Sakhi Jan Khan (Bannu District)

Balochistan
Nawab Akbar Khan Bugti (Dera Bugti), Jam Mir Ghulam Qadir Khan (Lasbela District) Sardar Hafeez and Sardar Waleed Umar Rind (Turbat)

References

Political parties in Pakistan
Political parties established in 1955
Republicanism in Pakistan
Secularism in Pakistan
Defunct political parties in Pakistan
Muslim League breakaway groups
1955 establishments in Pakistan